This article includes a list of biblical proper names that start with A in English transcription. Some of the names are given with a proposed etymological meaning. For further information on the names included on the list, the reader may consult the sources listed below in the References and External Links.

A – B – C – D – E – F – G – H – I – J – K – L – M – N – O – P – Q – R – S – T – U – V – Y – Z

A
Aaron, a teacher or lofty, bright, shining (etymology doubtful)
Abba, father
Abaddon, see Apollyon a destroyer,
Abagtha,  God-given "etymology doubtful"
Abana, perennial, stony
Abarim, regions beyond
Abda, a servant
Abdeel, servant of God
Abdi, my servant
Abdiel, servant of God
Abdon, servile
Abednego, servant of Nego, perhaps the same as Nebo
Abel, breath, vapor, transitoriness; breath, or vanity
Abel-beth-maachah, meadow of the house of Maachah, "also called ABEL-MAIM"
Abel-cheramim
Abel-maim
Abel-meholah, meadow of dancing, or the dancing-meadow
Abel-mizraim, the meadow of the Egyptians
Abel-shittim, meadow of the acacias
Abez, lofty
Abi
Abiyyah
Abi-albon, father of strength, i.e. "valiant"; "also called ABIEL"
Abiasaph, father of gathering, i.e. gathered father of gathering; the gatherer
Abiathar, father of abundance, i.e. liberal, father of abundance, or my father excels
Abib, an ear of corn, green fruits
Abida (or Abidah)
Abidan, father of the judge
Abiel, father (i.e., "possessor") of God = "pious"
Abiezer (or Abieezer), father of help, helpful
Abigail, father, i.e. source, of joy
Abihail, father of, i.e. possessing, strength
Abihu, he (God) is my father, father of Him; i.e., "worshipper of God"
Abihud, father of renown, famous, father (i.e., "possessor") of renown
Abijah, father (i.e., "possessor or worshipper") of Yahweh
Abijam, father of the sea; i.e., "seaman", Abijah or Abijam: my father is Yahweh
Abilene, land of meadows
Abimael, father of Mael, God is a father
Abimelech, father of the king; "my father a king, or, father of a king"
Abinadab, father of nobleness; i.e., "noble"
Abinoam
Abiram, father of height; i.e., "proud"
Abishag
Abishai, father of (i.e., "desirous of") a gift
Abishalom
Abishua, father of welfare; i.e., "fortunate"
Abishur, father of the wall father of the wall, i.e. "mason"
Abital, father of the dew father of the dew, i.e. "fresh"
Abitub, father of goodness,
Abiud, father of praise
Abner, father of light
Abram, a high father
Abraham, father of a multitude
Absalom, father of peace
Abubus
Accad
Accho
Aceldama, field of blood
Achab
Achaia, trouble
Achaicus, belonging to Achaia
Achan, or Achar, troubler
Achaz
Achbor, mouse
Achim
Achish
Achmetha
Achor
Achsah
Achshaph
Achzib, lying, false
Adadah, festival or boundary, possible miswritten form of Aroer
Adah, ornament, ornament, beauty
Adaiyyah
Adalia
Adam, red earth
Adamah, red earth
Adami, my man; earth
Adar, high
Adbeel
Addi, ornament
Addin
Addon, lord
Adiel

Adin, Adina, dainty, delicate
Adithaim, double ornament
Adlai
Admah
Admatha
Admin
Adna
Adnah
Adoni-bezek (or Adonibezek)
Adonijah, my lord is Yahweh
Adonikam
Adoniram
Adoni-zedek
Adoraim
Adoram
Adrammelech, splendor of the king
Adramyttium
Adria
Adriel, God is helper
Aduel
Adullam
Adummim
Aedias
Aeneas (or Æneas)
Aenon (or Ænon)
Aesora
Agabus
Agag
Agagite
Agar
Agee
Aggaba (variant of Hagabah)
Agia (Greek variant of Hebrew Hattil)
Agrippa
Agur
Ahab, uncle
Aharah
Aharhel
Ahasbai
Ahasuerus
Ahava
Ahaz, one that takes or possesses
Ahaziyyah
Ahi, my brother; my brethren
Ahiah
Ahiam
Ahian
Ahiezer
Ahihud
Ahijah, brother of the Lord
Ahikam, a brother who raises up
Ahilud
Ahimaaz
Ahiman, brother of the right hand
Ahimelech, brother of the king
Ahimoth, brother of death
Ahinadab
Ahinoam
Ahio
Ahira, brother of evil, i.e. unlucky
Ahiram
Ahisamach
Ahishahar, "the [divine] brother is dawning light"
Ahishar
Ahithophel, brother of foolishness
Ahitub, brother of goodness
Ahlab
Ahlai, beseeching; sorrowing; expecting
Ahoah
Aholah

Aholiab
Aholibah
Aholibamah, my tabernacle is exalted
Ahumai, brother of water, i.e. cowardly
Ahuzam
Ahuzzath
Ai, or Hai, heap of ruins
Aiah
Aiath
Aijeleth-Shahar
Ain, spring, well
Ajalon
Akeldama
Akkad
Akkub
Akrabbim
Alammelech
Alemeth
Alian
Alleluyah, praise ye Yahweh
Allon, an oak
Allon-bachuth
Almodad, measure
Almon, concealed
Almon-diblathaim
Alpheus
Alush
Alvah
Amad
Amal, labor
Amalek
Aman
Amana
Amariyyah, the Lord says, i.e. promises
Amasa
Amasia
Amashai
Ami
Amaziah, the strength of the Lord
Aminadab
Amittai
Ammah
Ammi, my people
Ammiel
Ammihud, people of praise
Amminadab
Ammishaddai
Ammizabad
Ammon
Amnon, faithful
Amok
Amon
Amorite
Amos, burden
Amoz, strong; robust
Amplias, large
Amram, an exalted people
Amraphel
Amzi, strong
Anab, grape-town
Anah, one who answers
Anaharath
Anaiah, whom Yahweh answers
Anak
Anamim
Anammelech
Anani
Ananias
Anathema
Anathoth
Andrew, manly
Andronicus
Anem
Aner
Aniam
Anim
Anna, grace
Annas, humble
Antichrist
Antioch
Antipas
Antipatris, for his father
Antothijah, answers of Yahweh
Anub
Apelles 
Apharsathchites, etymology uncertain
Aphek, strength
Aphekah
Aphik
Aphiah
Apocalypse, revelation
Apocrypha, concealed, hidden
Apollonia
Apollonius
Apollos
Apollyon, a destroyer, angel of the bottomless pit
Appaim, nostrils
Apphia
Aquila, an eagle
Ar
Ara
Arab
Arabia, barren, desert
Arad, a wild ass
Arah, wayfaring
Aram, high
Aran, wild goat
Ararat
Araunah, ark
Arba, city of the four
Archelaus, the prince of the people
Archippus, master of the horse
Arcturus
Ard, one that descending, descent
Ardon
Areli
Areopagus
Aretas
Argob
Ariel, lion of God
Arimathea
Arioch
Aristarchus, the best ruler
Aristobulus, the best counsellor
Armageddon, the hill or city of Megiddo
Arnon
Aroer
Arpad
Arphaxad
Artaxerxes, the great warrior
Artemas
Arumah, height
Asa, physician; cure
Asahel, made by God
Asaiah, the Lord has made
Asaph, collector of the people
Asareel
Asenath, worshipper of Neith
Ashan, smoke
Ashbel, old fire
Ashdod
Asher, happy, blessed 
Asherah
Ashima
Ashkenaz, spreading fire
Ashnah
Ashriel
Ashtaroth
Ashur, black
Asia
Asiel, created by God
Askelon
Asnapper
Asriel, 
Assir, captive
Asshurim, possibly peasants
Assos, approaching
Assur, same as Ashur
Assyria
Asuppim, house of gatherings
Asyncritus, incomparable
Atad, a thorn
Atarah, a crown
Ataroth, crowns
Ataroth-addar
Ater, shut up
Athach
Athaiah, "meaning obscure"
Athaliah
Athlai
Attai
Attalia, from Attalus
Augustus, venerable
Ava
Aven
Avim
Avith
Azaliah, "Yahweh has reserved"
Azaniah, Yahweh listened
Azariah
Azaz, strong
 Azazel
Azaziah
Azekah
Azgad, "Gad is strong"
Azmaveth
Azmon
Aznoth-tabor, ears of Tabor
Azor
Azotus
Azrael
Azriel, help of God
Azrikam
Azubah, forsaken
Azur
Azzan
Azzur, one who helps

References
Comay, Joan, Who's Who in the Old Testament, Oxford University Press, 1971, 
Lockyer, Herbert, All the men of the Bible, Zondervan Publishing House (Grand Rapids, Michigan), 1958
Lockyer, Herbert, All the women of the Bible, Zondervan Publishing 1988, 
Lockyer, Herbert, All the Divine Names and Titles in the Bible, Zondervan Publishing 1988, 
Tischler, Nancy M., All things in the Bible: an encyclopedia of the biblical world , Greenwood Publishing, Westport, Conn. : 2006

Inline references 

A